Gautier Capuçon (born 3 September 1981) is a French cellist.

Biography
Gautier Capuçon was born in Chambéry, Savoie, the youngest of three siblings. His brother is the violinist Renaud Capuçon.

He started learning the cello when he was four years old. He began his formal musical education in his hometown at the Ecole Nationale de Musique de Chambéry, where he graduated with first prizes in cello and in piano.

In Paris, he studied the cello initially with Annie Cochet-Zakine, who had heard him in Chambéry and brought him with her to the Conservatoire Supérieur de Paris (CNR), where he graduated in 1997 with the first prize in cello. He then became a pupil of cello pedagogue Philippe Muller at the Conservatoire National Supérieur de Musique de Paris (CNSMP), where he graduated in 2000 with first prizes in cello and chamber music. After that, he finished his studies with Heinrich Schiff at the University of Music and Performing Arts, Vienna.

Between 1997 and 1998, as a student, he was a cellist in the European Community Youth Orchestra (now the European Union Youth Orchestra) and also in the Gustav Mahler Jugendorchester, playing under conductors including Bernard Haitink, Pierre Boulez and Claudio Abbado.

He is also an accomplished pianist. He started learning the piano at the age of seven and studied it as his second instrument at the Conservatoire Supérieur de Paris under Christophe Egiziano. He enjoys playing jazz piano recreationally. Now he teaches at Classe d'Excellence de Fondation Louis Vuitton with young students.

Cello 
Capuçon's principal instrument is a 1701 Matteo Goffriller cello which he has on loan. He also has a 1746 Joseph Contreras cello on loan from BSI (Banca della Svizzera Italiana).

Speaking about his Goffriller cello in April 2008, he said:

"I am very lucky to be playing this cello for ten, nearly eleven, years now. It is a Matteo Goffriller, of the Venetian school, from 1701. All the Goffriller cellos that I have tried are not easy to play. For each note you need to know how much bow pressure, how much vibrato and how much bow speed you can put on it. It is an instrument that you really need to know to be able to play; it is not like a Montagnana or a Stradivarius. Montagnana, for example – most of them are really easy to play. So in a way, on the Goffriller, I probably search more and look more for different things."

Describing a Montagnana cello as his "dream" instrument of choice, he said: "I hope one day to be able to play on a Montagnana."

Awards 
First prize, Maurice Ravel International Academy of Music competition, Saint-Jean-de-Luz, France, 1998
Second prize, 3rd Adam International Cello Festival and Competition, Christchurch, New Zealand, 1999
First prize, 1er André Navarra International Cello Competition, Toulouse, France, 1999
Victoires de la Musique Classique, "New Talent of the Year", 2001
Borletti-Buitoni Trust Award, 2004
Echo Classics Award (category: Young Artist of the Year) Germany, 2004
Echo Classics Award (category: Chamber Music Recording of the Year (20th/21st Century)), Germany 2007
Echo Classics Award (category: Concerto Recording of the Year) Germany 2010/2011
Echo Classics Award (category: Chamber Music Recording of the Year (19th Century)/Mixed Ensemble)) Germany, 2012

Discography
Gautier Capuçon was an exclusive recording artist for Virgin Classics (a division of EMI). In 2015 he recorded for Erato, a division of Warner Music Group.

Orchestral
Dvorak – Cello Concerto, 2009
Herbert – Cello Concerto no.2, 2009
Haydn – Cello Concertos, 2003
Brahms – Double Concerto, 2007
Tchaikovsky – Variations on a Rococo Theme, 2010
Prokofiev – Sinfonia Concertante, 2010
Saint-Saëns - Cello Concerto n°1, 2013
Shostakovich – Cello Concertos, 2015
Schumann - Cello Concerto, 2019

Chamber
Ravel – Chamber Music, 2002
Face à Face: Violin & Cello Duets, 2003
Saint Saëns – Carnival of the Animals, 2003
Brahms Piano Trios, 2004
Schubert – Trout Quintet, 2004
Inventions: Violin & Cello Duets (Bach, Eisler, Karol Beffa, Bartok, Martinu), 2006
Schubert Piano Trios, 2007
Rachmaninov & Prokofiev: Cello Sonatas, 2008
Fauré: Complete chamber music for strings, 2011

Other albums
In addition, Gautier Capuçon has featured in EMI's annual CD releases of live recordings from the Lugano Festival each year, "Martha Argerich & Friends", at which he is a frequent returning guest performer.

He also released these albums:

Collaborations

DVDs

Management
Gautier Capuçon is represented by:

France: Agence Artistique Jacques Thelen, Paris
UK: Harrison Parrott
Germany: Weigold & Böhm
North America: Columbia Artists Management Inc., New York
Japan: Kajimoto Concert Management, Tokyo

References

External links
Official website
Gautier Capuçon's discography on EMI Classics

1981 births
Living people
People from Chambéry
French classical cellists
Conservatoire de Paris alumni
Erato Records artists